Telmatobius cirrhacelis is a species of frog in the family Telmatobiidae.
It is endemic to Ecuador.
Its natural habitats are subtropical or tropical moist montane forest and rivers.
It is threatened by habitat loss. It is currently critically endangered.

References

cirrhacelis
Endemic fauna of Ecuador
Amphibians of Ecuador
Amphibians of the Andes
Taxonomy articles created by Polbot
Amphibians described in 1979